William Stuart (born 1890) was an English footballer who played as a defender. During his career, he played for Bolton Wanderers, Liverpool and Wrexham.

External links
 LFC History profile

1890 births
English footballers
Bolton Wanderers F.C. players
Liverpool F.C. players
Wrexham A.F.C. players
Year of death missing
Association football defenders